Townsendiellomyia nidicola is a species of bristle fly in the family Tachinidae.

Distribution
Europe, introduced to New England.

References

Exoristinae
Diptera of Europe
Diptera of North America
Insects described in 1908
Taxa named by Charles Henry Tyler Townsend